Paul Calvert may refer to:
 Paul Calvert (politician), senator for Tasmania
 Paul Calvert (baseball), Canadian baseball player
 Paul T. Calvert, United States Army general